Accurist Watches Ltd is an English watch manufacturer, headquartered in Leicestershire. The brand was established in 1946 in St John Street, Clerkenwell, London, by Asher and Rebecca Loftus.

Accurist became the first company to sponsor the United Kingdom's speaking clock service between 1986 and 2008, and also sponsored a Millennium Countdown clock at the Royal Observatory, Greenwich, which counted down the last 1,000 days before the year 2000 at the historic observatory.

The Loftus family maintained ownership of the company until 2014 when Time Products Limited, which operate Sekonda and Limit, acquired the brand.

References

Manufacturing companies based in London
Manufacturing companies established in 1946
Watch brands
1946 establishments in England